Mark Fenton (born November 14, 1983 in Hawthorne, California) is a former American football center. He played with the Denver Broncos and Houston Texans of the National Football League as well as the Boise Burn of Arena Football 2 (af2) throughout the course of his career.. He was signed by the Broncos as an undrafted free agent in 2007. He played college football at Colorado.

External links
Colorado Buffaloes bio
Denver Broncos bio
Houston Texans bio

1983 births
Living people
Sportspeople from Hawthorne, California
Players of American football from California
American football offensive guards
American football centers
Colorado Buffaloes football players
Denver Broncos players
Houston Texans players
Boise Burn players